Tua Birgitta Forsström (born 2 April 1947) is a Finland-Swedish writer who writes in Swedish. She was awarded the Nordic Council Literature Prize in 1998 for the poetry collection Efter att ha tillbringat en natt bland hästar. Forsström's work is known for its engagement with the Finnish landscape, travel and conflicts within relationships. She often uses quotations in her work, sometimes placing them directly into her poems and at other times using them as introductions or interludes in her sequences. She has used quotations from Egon Friedell, Ludwig Wittgenstein, Hermann Hesse and Friedrich Nietszche. In the collection After Spending a Night Among Horses (1997) Forsström uses quotations from the Andrei Tarkovsky film Stalker, they are placed as interludes in a sequence of pieces and sit alone on the page, without direct reference to their source on the page, leaving this to a Notes & Quotations section at the end of the book.

She published her first book in 1972, A Poem about Love and Other Things. Her breakthrough into the English-speaking world came in 1987 with her sixth collection, Snow Leopard, which was translated into the English by David McDuff and published by Bloodaxe Books. In 1990, the book won a Poetry Book Society Translation Award in the United Kingdom. In 2006, I Studied Once at a Wonderful Faculty was published by Bloodaxe Books, with translations from David McDuff and Stina Katchadourian. The collection contains Snow Leopard (1987), The Parks (1992), After Spending a Night Among Horses (1997) and a new poem sequence called Minerals.

On 7 February 2019, Forsström was elected a member of the Swedish Academy, succeeding Katarina Frostenson in seat 18. She was inducted in December 2019.

Bibliography

 A Poem About Love and Other Things (1972)
 Where the Notes End (1974)
 Actually We are Very Happy (1976)
 Yellow bird's-nest (1979)
 September (1983)
 Snow Leopard (1987)
 The Mariana Trench (1990)
 The Parks (1992)
 After Having Spent a Night Among Horses (1997)
 I Studied Once at a Wonderful Faculty'' (2003)

Awards
Nordic Council's Literature Prize 1998

References

1947 births
Living people
People from Porvoo
Finnish poets in Swedish
Nordic Council Literature Prize winners
Finnish women poets
20th-century Finnish poets
20th-century Finnish women writers
21st-century Finnish women writers
21st-century Finnish poets
International Writing Program alumni
Swedish-speaking Finns
Members of the Swedish Academy